Judith Anne Turner (born 2 August 1956) is a New Zealand politician who was the deputy leader of United Future New Zealand. She was a member of the New Zealand House of Representatives as a list MP from 2002 to 2008, and the mayor of Whakatāne from 2019 to 2022.

Member of Parliament 

Turner was first elected as a United Future list MP at the 2002 election.

In December 2004 United Future party members chose her as their deputy leader. In September 2005, Turner and Gordon Copeland became the only two United Future List MPs re-elected alongside Peter Dunne  (who won an electorate seat). Although Copeland left the party in 2007, Turner indicated that she would remain within the United Future caucus.

In the 2008 election, Turner stood as a United Future candidate for the East Coast electorate. However, she failed to win the electorate, and United Future did not poll sufficiently well for a second list MP during the 2008 New Zealand general election. As a consequence, Turner did not return to Parliament.

In June 2009, Turner stood as an electorate candidate for United Future in Auckland's Mount Albert, polling eighth at 89 votes. She was outpolled by the Bill and Ben Party co-leader Ben Boyce (158 votes), as well as the Aotearoa Legalise Cannabis Party's Dakta Green (92 votes) and The Kiwi Party's Simmone Dyer (91 votes).

Former parliamentary roles 
 Member, Business Committee
 Member, Finance and Expenditure Committee
 Member, Social Services Committee

UFNZ caucus roles 
 Deputy Leader
 Member, Health select committee 27 August 2002 – 11 August 2005
 Spokesperson, Drugs 2002–2005
 Spokesperson, Family and Children 2002–2005
 Spokesperson, Senior Citizens 2002–2005
 Spokesperson, Social Services 2002–2005
 Spokesperson, Women's Affairs 2002–2005
 Spokesperson, Health 2005–2008
 Spokesperson, Education and Research 2005–2008
 Spokesperson, Family and Social Services 2005–2008
 Spokesperson, Māori and Treaty Issues 2005–2008

Local political career
Turner was elected to Whakatāne District Council in the 2010 local elections and served three terms (i.e. until 2019) as deputy mayor. In the 2019 local elections, she won the mayoral election after the incumbent retired.

Personal details 
Born 2 August 1956, Turner is married with three adult children. Before entering politics, she worked simultaneously as an art teacher and as a pastoral and community worker at a local New Life Church.

References 

1956 births
Living people
United Future MPs
Women members of the New Zealand House of Representatives
New Zealand list MPs
Unsuccessful candidates in the 1999 New Zealand general election
Unsuccessful candidates in the 2008 New Zealand general election
Members of the New Zealand House of Representatives
Deputy mayors of places in New Zealand
21st-century New Zealand politicians
21st-century New Zealand women politicians
Unsuccessful candidates in the 2017 New Zealand general election
Mayors of Whakatāne